The 2022 P. League+ draft, the second edition of the draft, is scheduled to be held on July 28, 2022 at Taipei New Horizon.

Draft selections

Notable undrafted players
These players were not selected in the 2022 P. League+ draft, but have played at least one game in the P. League+.

Trades involving draft picks

Combine
The 2022 Draft Combine was held on July 20 at National Taiwan University of Arts Gymnasium.

Entrants

Local

Chang Chen-Ya – F, NCCU
Chen Chia-Hsun – G, USC
Chen Fan Po-Yen – F, UCH
Chen Hong-Yu – G, NFU
Chen Kuei-En – G, VNU
Chen Ting-Yu – F, PCCU
Chuang Chia-Cheng – F, NTSU
He Jia-Jyun – G, NKNU
Huang Hong-Yu – G, NTNU
Jian Ting-Jhao – G, UCH
Jiang Hao-Wei – G, HWU
Kao Cheng-En – G, UCH
Kao Shih-Chieh – F, NKNU
Kuo Han – C, NTSU
Lai Chun-Ting – G/F, Spire Academy
Lan Chun-Yi – F, NTUST
Li Wei-Ting – G, SHU
Lin Bin-Hao – G, Citrus
Lin Jhe-Ting – G, FJU
Lin Tzu-Wei – G, NKNU
Lin Yu-Kae – G, GBS
Lu Tsai Yu-Lun – F, Sendai
Pai Yao-Cheng – G, ISU
Shen Yu-Chang – F, NTHU
Tsai Ya-Hsuan – G, NPTU
Tseng Po-Yu – G, MDU
Wu Tsung-Hsien – F, NTSU
Zhang Shi-Wei – F, NTCUST

Foreign student

 Amdy Dieng – C, NCCU
 Ifeanyi Eboka – F, SHU
 Humphery Gabriel – F, VNU
 Jamarcus Mearidy – G, VNU

References

External links
Official site

Draft
P. League+ draft
P. League+ lists
July 2021 sports events in Asia
2022 in Taiwanese sport